William Whitcher (1832 — 3 March 1910) was an English first-class cricketer.  

Whitcher was born in 1832 at Emsworth, Hampshire. He made his debut in first-class cricket for Hampshire in 1864, which was the club's first season with first-class status. This came against Sussex. In this match he bowled 5 wicket-less overs in the Sussex first-innings. In Hampshire's first-innings, he ended the innings unbeaten without scoring. Having batted at number 10 in the first-innings, he opened the batting in Hampshire's second-innings. This promotion up the order was not successful, with Whitcher being run out for a duck. Sussex eventually won the match by 10 wickets.  He next appeared in first-class cricket for Hampshire in 1867, when he played his final first-class match against Kent. He scored his first first-class runs in Hampshire's first-innings, making 10 runs before being dismissed by George Bennett. In the second-innings he ended the innings unbeaten on 17. Whitcher bowled in the Kent first-innings, bowling 7 wicket-less overs. The match ended in a draw.

Whitcher died at Shirley in Southampton in March 1910.

References

External links

1832 births
1910 deaths
People from Emsworth
English cricketers
Hampshire cricketers